The 2015 Batman Cup was a professional tennis tournament played on hard courts. It was the first edition of the tournament, which was part of the 2015 ATP Challenger Tour. It took place in Batman, Turkey from April 6 to April 12, 2015.

Singles main-draw entrants

Seeds 

 Rankings are as of March 23, 2015.

Other entrants 
The following players received wildcards into the singles main draw:
  Altuğ Çelikbilek
  Barış Ergüden
  Barkın Yalçınkale
  Anıl Yüksel

The following players received entry from the qualifying draw:
  Riccardo Ghedin
  Aleksandre Metreveli
  Lukas Mugevičius
  Michael Venus

Champions

Singles 

  Dudi Sela def.  Blaž Kavčič, 6–7(5–7), 6–3, 6–3

Doubles 

  Aslan Karatsev /  Yaraslav Shyla def.  Mate Pavić /  Michael Venus, 7–6(7–4), 4–6, [10–5]

Batman Cup